Patrapur is one of the block headquarters of Ganjam district situated south of Odisha bordering to Andhra Pradesh. It is located southwest of Berhampur and southeast of Chikiti.  It is one of the biggest villages of Ganjam district, having more than 15,000 people.

Patrapur is a business center catering to surrounding villages. The major occupations are agriculture, trading and self-employment. People are dependent on rain for crops.  There are 3 Primary Schools, one Middle English School, one Girls' High School and one Co-educational High School. Banks like State Bank of India, Canara Bank, Co-operative Bank and important offices like JMFC Court, Block Office, Tahasil Office, Sub-Registrar Office, a Community Health Centre (C.H.C.), Fire Station and other establishments encourage people from nearby villages to come to the town. People speak Odia as mother tongue, however Telugu is an additional language because Patrapur borders with Andhra Pradesh.

External links
A news story about Patrapur

Villages in Ganjam district